Alonso de Ribera y Zambrano (1560 – March 9, 1617) was a Spanish soldier and twice Spanish royal governor of Chile (1601–1605 and 1612–1617).

Early life
Born in Úbeda, he was the illegitimate son of Hidalgo and Captain Jorge de Ribera Zambrana y Dávalos, who claimed descent from the kings of Aragon.

After studying mathematics, Ribera joined the Spanish army in Flanders. It was the beginning of a long and successful military career. He fought in various battles in France with Alexander Farnese, Duke of Parma. In addition, he was part of the Spanish Armada of 1588, and one of the followers of Cardinal Archduke Alberto, governor of the Netherlands.

His distinguished military service came to the attention of King Philip III. In 1599, the king named him governor and captain general of Chile, positions that he occupied from 1601 to 1605 and again from 1612 to 1617.

First royal government of Chile
The 1598 Disaster of Curalaba, in which the Spanish governor of Chile, Martín García Óñez de Loyola, was killed in a surprise attack by Mapuche Indians in southern Chile, had led to the abandonment of the cities of Santa Cruz de Óñez, La Imperial, Valdivia, Osorno, Angol, Villarrica, and all the other Spanish positions south of the Bío-Bío River. Even Chillán was temporarily depopulated, and the fort of Arauco and Concepción were besieged by Mapuches under Pelantaru.

The Spanish defense of the colony consisted mostly of a citizen militia, not considered adequate by the authorities. With the aim of improving the army, they wanted a governor with military experience. For this reason, Alonso de Ribera received the appointment, with the mandate of organizing a professional army.

He sailed from Seville in April 1600, with 300 men. Upon his arrival in America, he met with ex-Governor Alonso de Sotomayor, who briefed him on the situation in Chile and the Arauco War. He continued on to Peru, finally arriving at Concepción in February 1601.

After his arrival, and after an evaluation of the state of the military, Ribera wrote: "...these people were more poorly disciplined and more uninformed in military things than I ever could have believed." In 1604, he created a permanent army of 1,500 men, paid from royal revenues in Peru, the Real Situado. His strategic plan was to concentrate the Spanish forces in a series of forts along the frontier and consolidate Spanish power, which could then be advanced to the south. In his first period of government, he was able to advance into Mapuche territory and construct 19 forts.

He also organized the colonial property in and around Santiago. In August 1603, he designated Ginés de Lillo to conduct a general inspection of all the land, delineating the private properties granted by the governors and the cabildo (city government), to cut down on constant litigation.

The governor was also concerned about the situation of the Indians subjected to the encomienda system, and took steps to limit their abuse by the Spanish. For example, he prohibited the custom of Spanish women riding to mass or on visits in litters carried by Indians. He established new regulations for the mines, which allowed forced indigenous labor for eight months, but followed by a period of two years, four months before the same worker could be forced to return.

Trial of grievances and removal from office
Ribera, accustomed to the rich court life of Flanders, scandalized the more austere colonial society by introducing such things as grand banquets and parties, card-playing, sumptuous suits, and at table, the heretofore unknown fork. These novelties, together with the fact that Ribera had married a Crilla woman without the prior permission of the king, cost him a loss of prestige and ultimately forced him from office in 1605.

He was subjected to a juicio de residencia, or trial of grievances. The accusations against him were that he dealt rudely with soldiers, opened other people's correspondence, granted special favors to the relatives of his wife, played games of chance, persecuted two clergymen, and was not religious.

After leaving the government, he was transferred to Córdoba with his family. He remained there until 1612, when he again became governor of Chile.

Second government of Chile and death

He returned as governor in 1612. Father Luis de Valdivia had specifically requested his appointment from King Philip III. Valdivia was the originator of a new system of defensive warfare in Chile. He planned a static frontier separating the Spanish zone from the Indigenous zone, permitting no one but missionaries to enter the south from the Spanish side. The king was in agreement, and although Ribera himself did not totally agree, he followed the royal orders and established the defensive system.

However, after the death of missionaries sent into the Indigenous zone by Father Valdivia, Ribera became convinced that the system was a failure. The previously warm relationship between the priest and the governor cooled.

Among Ribera's tasks in his second term was the defense of the Chilean coast from attacks by Dutch corsairs, beginning in 1613. One such expedition was a fleet of six ships sent by the Dutch East India Company to the Moluccas, via the Strait of Magellan. This fleet was under the command of Admiral Joris van Spilbergen. As soon as the governor was informed of the approach of Spilbergen, he ordered the fortification of Valparaíso and Concepción. Spilbergen did not attack the Chilean coast, but sailed past it to the north.

During Ribera's administration, on January 29, 1616, an expedition under the command of Jacob Le Maire, and with Wilhelm Cornelisz Schouten as pilot, discovered Cape Horn.

Governor Alonso de Ribera died in Concepción on March 9, 1617.

References
 A biographical article 
 José Toribio Medina,  Diccionario biográfico colonial de Chile, Impr. Elziviriana, Santiago, 1906, Pg. 741 - 744 RIBERA (Alonso de)
 Diego Barros Arana,  Historia general de Chile, 2a. ed. Santiago de Chile : Universitaria : Centro de Investigaciones Diego Barros Arana, 1999- v, Alonso de Ribera  
  Tomo III, Capítulo XVIII, Alonso de Ribera: principios de su gobierno, (1601), p. 251-274
  Tomo III, Capítulo XIX,  Gobierno de Alonso de Ribera: establecimiento de una línea fortificada de frontera (1601-1603), p. 275-292
  Tomo III, Capítulo XX, Gobierno de Alonso de Ribera: sus dificultades en la administración interior. Sus últimas campañas: es separado del mando de Chile (1603-1605), p. 293-328
 Diego Barros Arana,  Historia general de Chile, Tomo IV, Edición digital basada en la 2ª edición de Santiago de Chile, Editorial Universitaria, Centro de Investigaciones Diego Barros Arana, 2000.
  Tomo IV, Capítulo II, Segundo gobierno de Alonso de Ribera. Primeros resultados de la guerra defensiva (1612-1613)
  Tomo IV, Capítulo III, Segundo gobierno de Alonso de Ribera; continuación de la guerra defensiva. Los holandeses en el Pacífico (1613-1615)
  Tomo IV, Capítulo IV, Fin del segundo gobierno de Ribera; interinato del licenciado Hernando Talaverano; gobierno de don Lope de Ulloa y Lemos (1615-1620)

External links 

1560 births
1617 deaths
People from Úbeda
Royal Governors of Chile
Knights of Santiago
Spanish soldiers
Spanish people in the Viceroyalty of Peru